Rémi Saudadier (born 20 March 1986) is a water polo player from France. He was part of the French team at the 2016 Summer Olympics, where the team was eliminated in the group stage.

References

French male water polo players
Living people
1986 births
Sportspeople from Dijon
Olympic water polo players of France
Water polo players at the 2016 Summer Olympics
Competitors at the 2018 Mediterranean Games
Mediterranean Games competitors for France
20th-century French people
21st-century French people